Shadrack Byfield (sometimes Shadrach, 1879-178 January, 1874) was a British infantryman who served in the 41st Regiment during the War of 1812. He is best known as the author of a memoir of his wartime experiences, A Narrative of a Light Company Soldier's Service, published in his hometown of Bradford on Avon in England in 1840. This work is notable as one of the only accounts of the conflict penned by a common British soldier.

Early life and military service
Born in Woolley, a suburb of Bradford on Avon to a family of weavers in 1789, Byfield enlisted in the Wiltshire Militia in 1807, aged eighteen. Two years later, he volunteered into the 41st Regiment and was sent to join the regiment in North America, serving in Lower Canada and at Fort George in modern-day Niagara-on-the-Lake prior to the outbreak of war.

As a private in the 41st, Byfield saw heavy action during the Anglo-American War of 1812. In the conflict's western theatre, he served at the Siege of Detroit and the Battle of Frenchtown, where he was wounded in the shoulder, as well as at the Siege of Fort Meigs and the Battle of Fort Stephenson. Byfield narrowly escaped capture after British defeat at the Battle of the Thames and later rejoined elements of his regiment in the Niagara Peninsula. Byfield participated in the Capture of Fort Niagara and the Battle of Lundy's Lane, but his left arm was shattered by a musket ball at the Battle of Conjocta Creek, an unsuccessful British raid on 3 August 1814 preceding the Siege of Fort Erie. Byfield's forearm was subsequently amputated and he was invalided back to England, where he was awarded a pension from the Royal Hospital Chelsea in 1815.

Later life
Byfield returned to Bradford on Avon and married but was prevented from working at his trade because he required use of both hands to operate a loom. However, according to his memoirs, a design for an 'instrument' came to him one night in a dream; this contraption enabled him to work at a loom with just one arm, allowing him to provide for his family.

Byfield published a memoir of his wartime experiences in 1840. Although some sources speculate that he died c.1850, more recent research suggests that Byfield actually died on 17 January 1874 in Bradford on Avon, aged 84.

He also served as keeper of the Lord Edward Somerset Monument at Hawkesbury Upton in Gloucestershire from its completion in 1845 until he was dismissed from the post in 1853.

Significance
Shadrack Byfield's Narrative provides a rare common soldier's perspective of the War of 1812, and as such his account, considered to be a critical source for studying the conflict, has frequently been republished or anthologised. 
Byfield has often been portrayed as the archetypical 1812-era British soldier by modern historians. John Gellner, who edited Byfield's memoirs in 1963, asserted that his story "could have been told by any one of those humble, patient, iron-hard British regulars who more than made up in discipline, training and bravery for their lack of numbers."

Byfield's account has frequently been referenced in secondary histories of the war, notably in Pierre Berton's popular histories The Invasion of Canada and Flames Across the Border.

Shadrack Byfield's story has commonly been featured in museum exhibits (for instance, at Old Fort Erie) and in documentaries on the War of 1812, including Canada: A People's History (2000) and PBS's The War of 1812 (2011).

Byfield is also the protagonist in a 1985 children's novel, Redcoat, by Canadian author Gregory Sass, which presents a heavily fictionalised account of his military experiences.

References

Further reading
 A PDF copy of Byfield's A Narrative of a Light Company Soldier's Service, held by the Toronto Public Library
 A transcribed version of Byfield's Narrative, courtesy of the 41st Military Living History Group

1789 births
1874 deaths
19th-century English memoirists
People from Bradford-on-Avon
British Army personnel of the Napoleonic Wars
British Army personnel of the War of 1812
British people of the War of 1812
British military personnel of the War of 1812